Harry J. Burrell  (May 26, 1867 – December 11, 1914) was an American Major League Baseball pitcher and right fielder. He played professionally for the St. Louis Browns of the American Association.

Biography
Burrell was born in Bethel, Vermont. He played major league baseball for one year in 1891. He played his first professional game on September 13, 1891, for the St. Louis Browns. His minor league career continued until 1900.

Burrell died on December 11, 1914, in Omaha, Nebraska. He is interred at Forest Lawn Cemetery in Omaha.

References

External links

 Baseball-Reference.Com
 Baseball Prospectus
 Baseball Almanac

19th-century baseball players
Major League Baseball pitchers
St. Louis Browns (AA) players
Baseball players from Vermont
1867 births
1914 deaths
Dubuque (minor league baseball) players
Joliet Giants players
Milwaukee Brewers (minor league) players
Marinette Badgers players
Menominee (minor league baseball) players
Springfield Ponies players
Wilkes-Barre Coal Barons players
Des Moines Prohibitionists players
Rock Island-Moline Islanders players
Memphis Lambs players
Memphis Giants players
Burlington Colts players
Omaha Omahogs players